PSIM may refer to:

 Physical security information management
 PSIM Software, CAD software by Powersim Inc.
 PSIM Yogyakarta, an Indonesian football club
 Maximalist Italian Socialist Party (PSIm)